Gee Vaucher (born 1945 in Dagenham, Essex, England) is a visual artist.

Biography 
Vaucher met her long-lasting creative partner Penny Rimbaud in the early 1960s when both were attending the South-East Essex Technical College and School of Art. In 1967, inspired by the film Inn of the Sixth Happiness, they set up the anarchist/pacifist open house Dial House in Essex, UK, which has now become firmly established as a 'centre for radical creativity'.

In 2016, Vaucher was awarded an honorary doctorate from the University of Essex.

Vaucher is vegetarian.

Works 
Her work with anarcho-punk band Crass was seminal to the 'protest art' of the 1980s. Vaucher has always seen her work as a tool for social change, and has expressed her strong anarcho-pacifist and feminist views in her paintings and collages. Vaucher also uses surrealist styles and methods.

She continues to design sleeves for Babel Label, and also designed the sleeve for The Charlatans' Who We Touch album. Vaucher has exhibited at the 96 Gillespie gallery in London. In 2007 and 2008 the Jack Hanley Gallery in San Francisco and Track 16 in Santa Monica ran exhibitions entitled "Gee Vaucher: Introspective", showing a wide selection of Vaucher's work.

The day after Donald Trump's election victory in November 2016, the British Daily Mirror newspaper featured Vaucher's 1989 painting Oh America on its front page.

Published collections 
In the foreword to her first book, a 1999 retrospective collection entitled Crass Art and Other Pre Post-Modernist Monsters, Ian Dury writes:

In her second book, Animal Rites: a pictorial study of relationships, she gives a commentary on the relationship between animals and humans, centered on the quote "All humans are animals, but some animals are more human than others."

Film 
Vaucher's film Gower Boy, made in collaboration with pianist Huw Warren, debuted at the 14th Raindance Film Festival in London in October 2006.

See also 
 Dial House, Essex
 Anarchism in the arts

References

Bibliography 

 Crass Art and Other Pre Post-Modernist Monsters - A collection of work by Gee Vaucher (AK Press 1999)
 Animal Rites: a pictorial study of relationships (Exitstencil Books, 2004)

External links 
 interview with Gee Vaucher
 MOCA documentary on the Art of Dave King and Gee Vaucher
 Something From Nothing: The Crass Art Of Gee Vaucher

1945 births
Living people
People from Dagenham
Anarcha-feminists
Anarcho-punk musicians
English anarchists
Crass members
Women in punk
Hippies